Roland Fleuret (25 December 1912 – 26 December 1995) was a French racing cyclist. He rode in the 1935 Tour de France.

References

1912 births
1995 deaths
French male cyclists
Place of birth missing